Airey (also known as Aireys) is a populated place in Dorchester County, Maryland, United States.

References

Populated places in Dorchester County, Maryland